The 1949 BYU Cougars football team was an American football team that represented Brigham Young University (BYU) as a member of the Skyline Six Conference during the 1949 college football season In their first season under head coach Chick Atkinson, the Cougars compiled an overall record of 0–11 with a mark of 0–5 against confernece  opponents, finished last in the Skyline Six , and were outscored by a total of 372 to 105.

Schedule

References

BYU
BYU Cougars football seasons
College football winless seasons
BYU Cougars football